

Æthelheah was a medieval Bishop of Sherborne.

Æthelheah was consecrated between 867 and 868. He died between 879 and 889.

Citations

References

External links
 

Bishops of Sherborne (ancient)
9th-century English bishops